Orhian Johnson (born October 9, 1989) is a former American football strong safety. He played college football at Ohio State.

Early years
Johnson played high school football for the Boca Ciega High School Pirates, located in Gulfport, Florida and was the starting varsity quarterback for three years. He also lettered in basketball while at Boca Ciega High School. He graduated high school in 2008.

Professional career

Houston Texans
On April 27, 2013, he signed with the Houston Texans as an undrafted free agent following the 2013 NFL Draft. On August 31, 2013, Johnson was released by the Texans as a final training camp cut.

Toronto Argonauts
On October 12, 2013, Johnson was signed to a practice roster agreement by the Toronto Argonauts of the Canadian Football League. He was released by the Argonauts on November 7, 2013.

Arizona Cardinals
On December 11, 2013, Johnson signed with the Arizona Cardinals practice squad. The Cardinals released Johnson on August 25, 2014.

Toronto Argonauts
On September 6, 2014, Johnson signed with the Toronto Argonauts of the Canadian Football League.

References

External links
CFL bio
Ohio State Buckeyes bio
Houston Texans bio

Living people
1989 births
American football safeties
Canadian football defensive backs
American players of Canadian football
Houston Texans players
Arizona Cardinals players
Toronto Argonauts players
Players of Canadian football from St. Petersburg, Florida
Players of American football from St. Petersburg, Florida